ANPA-1312 is a 7-bit news agency text markup specification published by the Newspaper Association of America, designed to standardize the content and structure of text news articles.

It was last modified in 1989 and is still the most common method of transmitting news to newspapers, web sites and broadcasters from news agencies in North and South America. Although the specification provides for 1200 bit-per-second transmission speeds, modern transmission technology removes any speed limitations.

Using fixed metadata fields and a series of control and other special characters, ANPA 1312 was designed to feed text stories to both teleprinters and computer-based news editing systems.

Although the specification was based upon the 7-bit ASCII character set, some characters were declared to be replaced by traditional newspaper characters, e.g. small fractions and typesetting code. As such, it was a bridge between older typesetting methods, newspaper traditions and newer technology.

Perhaps the best known part of ANPA-1312 was the category code system, which allowed articles to be categorized by a single letter. For example, sports articles were assigned category S, and articles about politics were assigned P. Many newspapers found the system convenient and sorted both incoming news agency and staff articles by ANPA-1312 categories.

Superseded in the early 1990s by IPTC Information Interchange Model and later by the XML-based News Industry Text Format, ANPA-1312's popularity in North America remains strong due, in part, to its widespread support by The Associated Press and the reluctance of newspapers to invest in new computers or software modifications.

A modified version — but with the same name — was implemented by several news agencies after the vendor of some early computer systems modified the specification for its own purposes.

An international standard, IPTC 7901, is widely used in Europe and is closely related to ANPA-1312.

External links
 Wire Service Transmission Guidelines (ANPA-1312 standard description)
 Newspaper Association of America
 International Press Telecommunications Council

References 

Markup languages
Metadata